Elisabeth "Sissy" Schwarz (born 19 May 1936) is an Austrian former figure skater who is best known for her career in pair skating. With Kurt Oppelt, she is the 1956 Olympic champion, the 1956 World champion, the 1956 European champion, and a five-time Austrian national champion (1952–56).

Skating career

Single skating 
Schwarz competed in single skating for a few years. She took the silver medal at the 1952 Austrian Championships, placed 19th at the 1952 Winter Olympics, and finished ninth at the 1953 European Championships. She never competed at the World Championships as a singles skater.

Pair skating 
Her partner in pair skating was Kurt Oppelt. In 1952, they won their first national title and were sent to their first European Championships, where they placed seventh. The pair then competed at the 1952 Winter Olympics in Oslo, Norway, where they placed ninth, and at the 1952 World Championships, finishing seventh.

Schwarz/Oppelt stepped onto the European podium for the first time at the 1953 European Championships, where they won the bronze medal, and then placed sixth at the World Championships. In 1954, they became European silver medalists and went on to win their first World medal, bronze, at the 1954 World Championships. They followed it up with silver at the 1955 World Championships, finishing as close runners-up to Canada's Frances Dafoe / Norris Bowden, who took their second World title.

After winning the Austrian national title for the fifth consecutive year, Schwarz/Oppelt became the 1956 European champions. They then competed at the 1956 Winter Olympics in Cortina d'Ampezzo, Italy. Skating to Banditenstreiche by Franz von Suppé, they won the gold medal ahead of Dafoe/Bowden, who faltered on a lift, causing them to finish after their music ended. The judging panel was split 6 to 3 in favor of Schwarz/Oppelt.

Schwarz/Oppelt went on to win the 1956 World title before retiring from competition. In the summer of 1956, they joined the Wiener Eisrevue and performed in ice shows for three or four years.

Later years 
In 1968, she decided to open a skating club in Wiener Neustadt and worked with Rudolf Lang to build a skating rink.

Personal life 
Schwarz married a lawyer and became known as Schwarz-Bollenberger. She has three children and lives in Wiener Neustadt.

Results

Pairs with Oppelt

Single skating

References

External links
Video clip of Schwartz and Oppelt at the 1956 Olympics
Video clip of Schwartz and Oppelt at the 1956 World Championships (rare and only pair recorded)
Video clip Video clip of 1956 World Championships Medal Ceremony.

Navigation

1936 births
Living people
Austrian female pair skaters
Austrian female single skaters
Figure skaters at the 1952 Winter Olympics
Figure skaters at the 1956 Winter Olympics
Olympic figure skaters of Austria
Olympic gold medalists for Austria
Figure skaters from Vienna
Olympic medalists in figure skating
World Figure Skating Championships medalists
European Figure Skating Championships medalists
Medalists at the 1956 Winter Olympics